Sture Henrik Ericsson (later Ewréus, 15 January 1898 – 6 September 1945) was a Swedish gymnast who competed in the 1920 Summer Olympics. He was part of the Swedish team that won the all-around Swedish system event.

References

1898 births
1945 deaths
Swedish male artistic gymnasts
Medalists at the 1920 Summer Olympics
Gymnasts at the 1920 Summer Olympics
Olympic gymnasts of Sweden
Olympic gold medalists for Sweden
Olympic medalists in gymnastics
Sportspeople from Örebro
19th-century Swedish people
20th-century Swedish people